The 1996 NAIA Division I football season was the NAIA, was the 27th (and final) season of play of the NAIA's top division for football. The NAIA reverted to a single division for its football championship in 1997.

The regular season was played from August to November 1996. The 1996 NAIA Division I Football Championship Series then concluded with the 1996 NAIA Champion Bowl, played that year on December 7, 1996 at Milam Stadium in Weatherford, Oklahoma.

Southwestern Oklahoma State defeated Montana Tech in the Champion Bowl, 33–31, to win their first NAIA national title.

Conference standings

Conference champions

Postseason

Bracket

See also
 1996 NCAA Division I-A football season
 1996 NCAA Division I-AA football season
 1996 NCAA Division II football season
 1996 NCAA Division III football season

References

 
NAIA Football National Championship